Focused assessment with sonography in trauma (commonly abbreviated as FAST)  is a rapid bedside ultrasound examination performed by surgeons, emergency physicians, and paramedics as a screening test for blood around the heart (pericardial effusion) or abdominal organs (hemoperitoneum) after trauma. There is also the extended FAST (eFAST) which includes some additional ultrasound views to assess for pneumothorax.

The four classic areas that are examined for free fluid are the perihepatic space (including Morison's pouch or the hepatorenal recess), perisplenic space, pericardium, and the pelvis.  With this technique it is possible to identify the presence of intraperitoneal or pericardial free fluid. In the context of traumatic injury, this fluid will usually be due to bleeding.

Indications 
Reasons a FAST or eFAST would be performed would be:
Blunt abdominal trauma
Penetrating abdominal trauma
Blunt thoracic trauma
Penetrating thoracic trauma
Undifferentiated shock (low blood pressure)

Contraindications 
Since the FAST/eFAST is performed with ultrasound, there is very little risk to the patient as ultrasounds only emit sound waves and record the echo to create a picture. The most common contraindication would be delay of definitive care such as surgical intervention in the setting of obvious trauma or resuscitative efforts in an extreme scenario.

Extended FAST 
The eFAST allows for the examination of both lungs by adding bilateral anterior thoracic sonography to the FAST exam. This allows for the detection of a pneumothorax with the absence of normal ‘lung-sliding’ and ‘comet-tail’ artifact (seen on the ultrasound screen). Compared with supine chest radiography, with CT or clinical course as the gold standard, bedside sonography has superior sensitivity (49–99% versus 27–75%), similar specificity (95–100%), and can be performed in under a minute. Several recent prospective studies have validated its use in the setting of trauma resuscitation, and have also shown that ultrasound can provide an accurate estimation of pneumothorax size. Although radiography or CT scanning is generally feasible, immediate bedside detection of a pneumothorax confirms what are often ambiguous physical findings in unstable patients, and guides immediate chest decompression. In addition, in the patient undergoing positive-pressure ventilation, the detection of an otherwise ‘occult’ pneumothorax prior to CT scanning may hasten treatment and subsequently prevent development of a tension pneumothorax, a deadly complication if not treated immediately, and deterioration in the radiology suite (in the CT scanner).

Components of the Examination 
There are five components to the eFAST exam:

 Right Upper Quadrant of the abdomen (Perihepatic view). Right upper quadrant is examined by working your probe down the midaxillary line starting at the right 8th rib to the 11th rib. This examines for free fluid around the kidney and liver.
 Left Upper Quadrant of the abdomen (Perisplenic view). Left upper quadrant is examined by working your probe down the midaxillary line starting at the left 8th rib to the 11th rib. This examines for free fluid around the kidney and spleen.
 Pelvic views (Long and transverse axis). The suprapubic view helps assess for free fluid in the pelvic cavity.
 Cardiac view. The pericardial component is assessed using the subxiphoid view.
 Lung views (Right and Left, Long axis). These final views help determine if a pneumothorax is present.

Findings
eFAST (extended focused assessment with sonography for trauma) allows an emergency physician or a surgeon the ability to determine whether a patient has pneumothorax, hemothorax, pleural effusion, mass/tumor, or a lodged foreign body. The exam allows for visualization of the echogenic tissue, ribs, and lung tissue. Few radiographic signs are important in any trauma and they include the stratosphere sign, the sliding or seashore sign, and the sinusoid sign.

Stratosphere sign is a clinical medical ultrasound finding usually in an eFAST examination that can prove presence of a pneumothorax. The sign is an imaging finding using a 3.5–7.5 MHz ultrasound probe in the fourth and fifth intercostal spaces in the anterior clavicular line using the M-Mode of the machine. This finding is seen in the M-mode tracing as pleura and lung being indistinguishable as linear hyperechogenic lines and is fairly reliable for diagnosis of a pneumothorax. Even though the stratospheric sign can be an indication of pneumothorax its absence is not at all reliable to rule out pneumothorax as definitive diagnosis usually requires X-ray or CT of thorax.

Seashore sign is another eFAST finding usually in the lungs in the M-mode that depicts the glandular echogenicity of the lung abutted by the linear appearance of the visceral pleura. This sign is a normal finding. In absence of a seashore sign or presence of a stratosphere sign, pneumothorax is likely. B-lines or "comet trails" are echogenic bright linear reflections beneath the pleura that are usually lost with any air between the probe and the lung tissue and therefore whose presence with seashore sign indicates absence of a pneumothorax.

Sinusoid sign is another M-mode finding indicating presence of pleural effusion. Due to the cyclical movement of the lung in inspiration and expiration, the motion-time tracing (M-mode) ultrasound shows a sinusoid appearance between the fluid and the line tissue. This finding indicates a possible pleural effusion, empyema, blood in pleural space (hemothorax).

Advantages
 
FAST is less invasive than diagnostic peritoneal lavage, involves no exposure to radiation and is cheaper compared to computed tomography, but achieves a similar accuracy.

Numerous studies have shown FAST is useful in evaluating trauma patients. It also appears to make emergency department care faster and better.

Interpretation

FAST is most useful in trauma patients who are hemodynamically unstable. A positive FAST result is defined as the appearance of a dark ("anechoic") strip in the dependent areas of the peritoneum. In the right upper quadrant this typically appears in Morison's Pouch (between the liver and kidney). This location is most useful as it is the place where fluid will collect with a supine patient. In the left upper quadrant, blood may collect anywhere around the spleen (perisplenic space). In the pelvis, blood generally pools behind the bladder (in the rectovesicular space). A positive result suggests hemoperitoneum; often CT scan will be performed if the patient is stable or a laparotomy if unstable. In those with a negative FAST result, a search for extra-abdominal sources of bleeding may still need to be performed.

See also
HEART scan

References

Further reading

External links
 Focus On: EFAST - Extended Focused Assessment With Sonography for Trauma: American College of Emergency Physicians (ACEP)
 eMedicine: Blunt abdominal trauma
 FAST exam tutorial 
 The FAST examination  from Trauma.org, includes tutorial videos.
Trauma FAST Exam - LUQ Exam 
 Lung ultrasound: ICU Sonography
 FOB Doc: Capt Ray Wiss, MD. By a pioneering teacher of FAST to ER and first responders, civilian and military.

Diagnostic emergency medicine
Medical ultrasonography
Traumatology